Charles Maitland MacFie (November 12, 1872 – 1961) was a farmer and politician in Ontario, Canada. He represented Middlesex South in the Legislative Assembly of Ontario from 1934 to 1943 as a Liberal.

The son of James Walker MacFie and Jane Ann McGregor (née Maitland), he was born on a farm in Mosa township and was educated in Appin, Glencoe, Chatham and at the Ontario Agricultural College. MacFie married Annabel Boyd. He served as reeve for four years.

References

External links

1872 births
1961 deaths
Ontario Liberal Party MPPs